Grindstone Lake may refer to:
Grindstone Lake in Montezuma County, Colorado
Grindstone Lake in Pine County, Minnesota
Grindstone Lake in Sawyer County, Wisconsin
Grindstone Pond, a small lake in Franklin County, Maine
Grindstone Pond, a small lake in Piscataquis County, Maine
Grindstone Reservoir in Crook County, Oregon
Grindstone Tank, a small lake in Coconino County, Arizona
Grindstone Tank, a small lake in Yavapai County, Arizona
Grindstone Tank, a small lake in La Salle County, Texas